Howdy Forrester (March 31, 1922 – August 1, 1987), born Howard Wilson Forrester, was an American bluegrass fiddler and a popularizer and practiser of the "Texas" or "show fiddle" style. He was a long-time member of Roy Acuff's Smoky Mountain Boys.

Biography
Forrester was born near Vernon, in Hickman County, Tennessee, into a family of many fiddlers; his father, grandfather, and uncle all played the fiddle. He grew up as the youngest of four brothers. In 1927, their father was killed in an automobile accident when his vehicle was hit by a train. In 1933, during a convalescence from rheumatic fever where he was bedridden for months, Forrester learned to play the fiddle.

After his family moved to Nashville in the mid 1930s, Forrester began performing with his brothers. In 1938, he joined The Vagabonds and landed a job on the Grand Ole Opry. When Herald Goodman of the Vagabonds formed another act called the Tennessee Valley Boys, Forrester was soon to join up. He and Herald Goodman received an offer in 1939 to join the Saddle Mountain Roundup radio show in Tulsa, Oklahoma. During this time, Forrester received his nickname, "Big Howdy," by Goodman.

In 1940, he moved to Nashville with his wife to work with Bill Monroe and Monroe's group, the Blue Grass Boys. In 1943, he was drafted and had to leave the band (he was replaced by Jim Shumate) but his wife Billie "Sally Ann" Forrester remained with Monroe as his sole accordion player until 1945. After Forrester's discharge from the US Navy in 1946, he returned temporarily to Monroe. Soon he moved to Dallas to join Georgia Slim Rutland and the Texas Roundup performing at KRLD-AM.

In 1950, he joined Cowboy Copas before becoming a full-time member of Roy Acuff and His Smoky Mountain Boys in 1951. He also made recordings with Flatt & Scruggs in the early 1950s. In 1960, he recorded a solo album called Fancy Fiddlin' Country Style for the MGM subsidiary Cub label. In 1964, Forrester left the Smoky Mountain Boys to join the Acuff-Rose Artists Corporation. He continued to record solo albums during the 1970s and 1980s.

Forrester died at his home in Nashville.

Notes

References
 Carlin, Richard (2003), Country Music: A Biographical Dictionary, Taylor & Francis
 Goldsmith, Thomas (2004), The Bluegrass Reader, University of Illinois Press
 Schlappi, Elizabeth (1993), Roy Acuff: The Smoky Mountain Boy, Pelican Publishing Company

1922 births
1987 deaths
American country singer-songwriters
American bluegrass fiddlers
Texas-style fiddlers
20th-century American singers
Foggy Mountain Boys members
Musicians from Nashville, Tennessee
People from Hickman County, Tennessee